Pre-Islamic Arab trade refers to the land- and sea-trade networks used by pre-Islamic Arab nations and traders. Some regions are also known as the incense trade route. Trade has been documented as early as the beginning of the second millennium BCE.

Antiquity 
A text from the era of Sargon of Akkad (r. c. 2334-2284 BCE) mentions a shipping industry in Magan, in present-day Oman. Excavations in the cities of Ur and Kish and in Bahrain and other locations along the east coast of the Arabian Peninsula have unearthed goods of Indian origin (including seals). Both indicate that the network of maritime trade was regular, bustling, and well-known as early as 3000 BC. They suggest that Bahrain and other sites along the Persian Gulf were popular docks which would welcome ships arriving from Iraq on their way to and from India.

Africa 
According to the 2nd-century BCE Greek historian Agatharchides, "It does not appear that there exists a people richer than the Sabaeans and the people of Gerrha who were agents of everything which fell under the name of shipping between Asia and Europe. They made Ptolemaic Syria rich and made Phoenician trade profitable in addition to hundreds of other things." He described them as fierce warriors and skilled seafarers, who sailed large ships to supply their colonies. The Palmyrene Empire built a shipyard in Characene, which facilitated the transport of goods through the Euphrates ports of Dura-Europos and Sura (the present-day village of Al-Hamam, east of the al-Thawra Dam in Syria). Some of the Palmyrenes who owned and sailed ships on the Persian Gulf and the Indian Ocean were attested by Chinese sailors who visited the region in 97 CE and mentioned the Characene port of Charax Spasinu. Characene surpassed Gerrha in the perfume trade. Despite the lack of direct control by the Nabataean Kingdom in the Persian Gulf, it was reachable by land (where goods would be loaded onto ships). Nabataean writings and manufactured goods (including typical Nabataean white dyes) have been discovered in the village of Thaj near the Persian Gulf, along the eastern coast of the Arabian Peninsula near Bahrain and as far as the ports of Yemen and Oman. They have also been found in archeological sites along the Incense Route, such as Qaryat al-Faw. Nabataean pottery has been uncovered in India; Nabataean inscriptions are scattered throughout the Mediterranean region, from Tunisia to Rhodes, Kos, Delos, Miletus in the Aegean Sea and in Pozzuoli and Rome. Late Antique to medieval trade amphorae contained different food stuffs including wine and olivre oil, perhaps the best known are so-called Aqaba/Ayla vessels from the Red Sea to South Asia. 

The Sabaeans had a long history of seafaring and commerce. A Sabaean presence in Africa was noted in antiquity with the founding of the kingdom of Dʿmt in Ethiopia in the 8th century BCE. The 1st-century CE historian Periplus of the Erythraean Sea described how the Arabs controlled the coast of "Ezana" (the East African coast north of Somalia). The Quran mentions trade with Sheba: "And We placed between them and the cities which We had blessed [many] visible cities. And We determined between them the [distances of] journey, [saying], "Travel between them by night or day in safety." The Old Testament Book of Ezekiel reads, "Dedan traded in saddle blankets with you. Arabia and all the princes of Kedar were your customers; they did business with you in lambs, rams and goats. ‘The merchants of Sheba and Raamah traded with you; for your merchandise they exchanged the finest of all kinds of spices and precious stones, and gold." The Chinese explorer Faxian, who passed through Sri Lanka in 414 CE, reported that Saebaean merchants and Arabs from Oman and Hadhramaut lived in ornate homes in settlements on the island and traded in timber. The Lakhmids also traded with Chinese ships which sailed along the Euphrates past the village of al-Hirah. In the northern Lakhmid kingdom (present-day Al Anbar Governorate flows the 'Isā River, which connects the Tigris and the Euphrates. To reach the Persian Gulf from al-Hirah, the Lakhmids traveled in smaller boats to the port in al-Ubulla (where there were sea ships bound for India and China). They would then depart for China via Bahrain and Aden.

The Qur'an mentions the winter and summer journeys which the tribe of Quraysh would make, since Mecca was on the Incense Road. Hashim ibn Abd Manaf, the great-grandfather of Muhammad, was a distinguished merchant whose trading post was in Gaza (where he died and was buried). He founded the "'īlāf," (solidarity), a series of commercial agreements between him, the tribe of Quraysh and the other factions with whom they traded. His tomb is in the Sayed al-Hashim Mosque.

Islamic sources also mention Muhammad's mercantile career in the Levant, beginning with a trip to the region with his uncle Abu Talib. In Bosra, the Nestorian priest Bahira foretold Muhammad's life. He later employed Khadija bint Khuwaylid, the woman who became his wife. According to Christian sources from 660 and 692 CE, "Mohammad would go to [the] lands of Palestine, Arabia, Syria, and Phoenicia to trade." Bosra has the Mosque of the Blessing of the Camel (which was blessed by Muhammad's camel in the caravan of his uncle, Abu Talib) and the Monastery of Bahira. Bosra is a Nabatean city, which became the capital after Petra. After the fall of the Nabatean Kingdom, the Romans made Bosra the capital of the Province of Arabia. A fourth-century Byzantine source notes the concentration of Arab commerce in Bosra.

Maritime trade 

The south Arabian navigation history were suggested by Gus van Beek that they are developed through their constant contacts with advanced maritime civilization. According to biblical historiographical research by Charles Henry Stanley Davis, a semitic maritime civilization named Phoenicia which dated from 1100 and 200 BC has long time planted colonies of merchants in Yemen. The prosperity of Gerrhan caused the Yemen and the Phoenician in the opening of Indian route commerce. The Phoenician colonies in Yemen has shipped merchant vessels came from India unloaded their cargoes in Yemen coasts and carried them across the Arabian desert to their hometown in Levant. The Phoenician merchants also settled in Persian gulf in their effort of transporting commodities from India to their hometown. Thus the trade activities between the local Yemenites and the Phoenician has formed a prosper ancient Arab kingdom, Gerrha. The commodities which brought by the Phoenician from Yemen and Persian gulf were transported with Arabian caravan crossing the desert towards Levant. 

Arab naval trade was contested by the Greeks, who tried to challenge Arab control of maritime trade between India and Egypt during the early Middle Ages. Arab trade persisted during the period, and Greek naval trade dwindled. There were a number of harbors on the Arabian Peninsula, some of which remain in operation. The most important harbors in the eastern Arabian Peninsula were Al-Ubulla, Gerrha and Sohar (Oman). The most important southern harbors were Mocha,  Qanī (now Bi'r `Ali, Yemen), Aden, and Muska (Samharam). The most important western ports included al-Sha'ibah, Aylah (Aqaba) and Luwikat Kuma (al-Hawra'). A sea route used by Arabs to reach the Indian subcontinent ran from "The Euphrates of Maysan" to Debal on the Indus River. They would also sail from al-Ubulla, passing Oman and on to India. Those who traveled from the harbors of Yemen, such as the Qanī and "Muza" of Gerrha, would sail directly to India without needing to stop and resupply.

Land trade 
The Arabs land trade, which spanned from their hometown in south of Yemen has touched the trades in Silk Road and Indian Ocean trade particularly in which the modern historians coined in "Frankincense and myrrh" theory, which spread by them through camel caravans. This south Arabian peoples trade activities has existed from the era of Queen of Sheba according to biblical historiography.

Land trade extended as far as the Caucasus Mountains. The first path led east, along Wadī Mayfa'a to Shabwa; the second led from Qanī to Wadī Hajar and passed through Wadī Armah, the water source for Shabwa. From Shabwa, the road turned towards Aden and led to Najran. The road continued northeast from Najdan to Wadī Al-Dawasir, passing the villages of al-Faw and al-Aflaj (where it branched in two directions). The first led east to the Persian Gulf, and the other led north to the Levant.

References 

Pre-Islamic Arabia
History of international trade